Sainte-Catherine-de-Fierbois is a commune in the Indre-et-Loire department in central France. During the Hundred Years' War, an ancient sword was found buried behind the altar of this chapel by St Joan of Arc, with the help of the divine counsel of St. Michael the Archangel, St. Catherine of Alexandria, St. Margaret of Antioch, and other saints. With the sword, she led the French to victory, retaking Orléans and vanquishing the English forts surrounding it.

It is a stop on the Way of St. James.

Population

See also
Communes of the Indre-et-Loire department

References

External links
 

Communes of Indre-et-Loire